In the 19th century, the Count Zubov family built an estate in Tarvydai Village, Lithuania, with cottages next to it for the servants of the estate. The village and the estate were named in honour of Count Dmitrij Zubov and were therefore called Dimitravas (it was renamed Tarvydai only in 1927).

In 1937-1940 the estate buildings were turned into a forced labour camp, and the inter-bellum Lithuanian (Smetona) government imprisoned individuals unfavourable to the government here, calling them communists and criminals. They were forced to gather stones in the surrounding areas and bring them back to the estate, where a stone breaking facility operated at the time.

History 
When Lithuania was occupied by Germans, the purpose of Dimitravas Estate changed once again, and in 1941-1944 a concentration camp was operated there. At first, representatives and activists of the Kretinga District Soviet were imprisoned there, but later 500 Skuodas Jewish women and children were imprisoned and later executed at the camp. Afterwards, families of the Soviet military were gathered there, and were later were transported to Germany and placed into forced labour camps.

At the end of the German occupation, in 1944, farmers who were either unwilling or unable to pay the taxes of the government were imprisoned in the Dimitravas camp. In 1944, there were about 500 prisoners in the camp.

On 9 July 1944, they organised a rebellion and escaped. Some of the prisoners were brought back by the Germans; however, three months later, the whole German army began to withdraw and they did not manage to stop another prisoners’ rebellion.

At the end of 1944, the Soviet government established a military camp in Dimitravas, where the training of recruits and the preparation of sergeants would take place. At the end of the war, the “Unity” (in Lithuanian “Vienybė”) collective farm was established on this site. Later, the Kretinga Regional Studies Museum was established in the mansion, but it was closed down in 1955. Presently, the building does not fulfil any public function.

Gallery

References 

History of Lithuania